Eldon Lee Johnson (November 5, 1908 – March 24, 2002) was an American college president. He was the tenth President of the University of New Hampshire from 1955 to 1961.
 Johnson oversaw significant growth at UNH, including the construction of eight major buildings

Johnson and the board of trustees of the University System of New Hampshire received the first Alexander Meiklejohn Award, given by the American Association of University Professors for the defense of academic freedom and free speech.

UNH named the 667 seat Johnson Theater located within the Paul Creative Arts Center in his honor

Selected works
From Riot to Reason, University of Illinois Press, 1971 
Academic adventures in Africa, 1999

References

External links 
University of New Hampshire: Office of the President
Full list of University Presidents (including interim Presidents) , University of New Hampshire Library
The Hampshire VOLUME No. 50, ISSUE 16

1908 births
2002 deaths
Presidents of the University of New Hampshire
20th-century American academics